An election to the United States House of Representatives was held in Pennsylvania on November 26, 1788, for the 1st Congress.

Background 
The United States Constitution was adopted on September 17, 1787, by the Constitutional Convention in Philadelphia, and then ratified by the States. Pennsylvania's legislature ratified the Constitution on December 12, 1787, by a vote of 46-23. On July 8, 1788, the Congress of the Confederation passed a resolution calling the first session of the 1st United States Congress for March 4, 1789, to convene at New York City and the election of senators and representatives in the meanwhile by the States.

Election
Pennsylvania's legislature scheduled the election for November 26, 1788, and provided for the election to be held on an at-large basis, an attempt by the Federalist-dominated legislature to prevent anti-Federalist Representatives from being elected in frontier districts.  Both parties submitted tickets with 8 candidates each.  The large German population in Pennsylvania tended to vote for German candidates, giving the Anti-Federalist Muhlenberg and Hiester enough votes to gain seats.

See also
 United States House of Representatives elections, 1788 and 1789

References
Electoral data and information on districts are from the Wilkes University Elections Statistics Project

1788
Pennsylvania
United States House of Representatives